
Year 769 (DCCLXIX) was a common year starting on Sunday (link will display the full calendar) of the Julian calendar. The denomination 769 for this year has been used since the early medieval period, when the Anno Domini calendar era became the prevalent method in Europe for naming years.

Events 
 By place 

 Europe 
 King Charlemagne (Charles "the Great") begins a military campaign against the Duchy of Aquitaine and the Duchy of Gascony. He leads a Frankish army to the city of Bordeaux, where he sets up a fort at Fronsac. His younger brother Carloman I refuses to help his brother fight the rebels, and returns to Burgundy. Hunald, duke of Aquitaine, is forced to flee to the court of Gascony. Lupus II, fearing Charlemagne, turns Hunald over in exchange for peace, and is put in a monastery. Aquitaine and Gascony are subdued into the Frankish Kingdom.

 By topic 

 Religion 
 April 12–15 – Pope Stephen III summons a Lateran Council: the papal election procedure (abuse of which has led to the election of antipopes) is changed, and the iconoclasm of the Council of Hieria is anathematized.
 The Monastery of Tallaght is founded by Máel Ruain in Ireland. The monastery becomes a centre of learning and piety, particularly associated with the Céli Dé spiritual reform movement.
 Hersfeld Abbey (modern-day Hesse-Nassau), Germany, is founded by Lullus, archbishop of Mainz (approximate date).

Births 
 Du Yuanying, chancellor of the Tang Dynasty (d. 833)
 Egbert, king of Wessex (or 771)
 Pepin the Hunchback, the first child of Charlemagne

Deaths 
 January 14 – Cui Huan, chancellor of the Tang Dynasty 
 March 9 – Alan of Farfa, Aquitanian scholar and hermit
 December 13 – Du Hongjian, chancellor of the Tang Dynasty (b. 709)
 Conchubhar mac Cumasgach, king of Uí Fiachrach Aidhne (Ireland)
 Cuthfrith, bishop of Lichfield (approximate date)
 Dub Calgaid mac Laidcnén, king of the Uí Ceinnselaig (Ireland)
 Gülnar Hatun, legendary Turkish heroine
 Ma'n ibn Za'ida al-Shaybani, Arab general and governor (or 770)

References